The Jackson lake springsnail, scientific name Pyrgulopsis robusta,  is a species of very small or minute freshwater snail with an operculum, an aquatic gastropod mollusk in the family Hydrobiidae. This species is endemic to the United States. It has 4.5 to 6.25 whorls, and is clear-white with a tan periostracum.

Taxonomy
In 2004, two species (P. idahoensis and P. hendersoni) were reclassified as P. robusta based on genetic analysis.  The species description was amended to capture a broader range in morphology.

References

Endemic fauna of the United States
Pyrgulopsis
Gastropods described in 1908
Taxa named by Edmund Murton Walker
Taxonomy articles created by Polbot